Jeffrey Carver Barkley (born November 21, 1959) is a former Major League Baseball pitcher who played for the Cleveland Indians for two seasons from 1984 to 1985.

Barkley played college baseball for The Citadel where he set a school record in strikeouts with 237. He was inducted into the school's athletics hall of fame in 2002.

Barkley made his Major League debut on September 16, 1984, against the Oakland Athletics. Manager Pat Corrales made the unconventional choice to pull pitcher Tom Waddell in the middle of a plate appearance and insert Barkley, who had been called up from the Maine Guides only two days earlier. Barkley inherited a two-strike count against Mike Davis and struck him out on the first pitch he threw in the Major Leagues.

Barkley never won a game at the major league level, but did pick up one career save. It came on July 1, 1985, against the Minnesota Twins. Barkley pitched  perfect innings to close out a 5-2 Indians victory. He saved the game for starter Vern Ruhle.

References

External links

1959 births
Living people
Major League Baseball pitchers
Cleveland Indians players
Batavia Trojans players
Portland Beavers players
Waterloo Indians players
Las Vegas Stars (baseball) players
Oklahoma City 89ers players
Maine Guides players
Charleston Charlies players
The Citadel Bulldogs baseball players
Baseball players from North Carolina
People from Hickory, North Carolina